Klaasen is Dutch patronymic surname ("son of Klaas"). Notable people with this name include:

 Berton Klaasen (born 1990), South African rugby union player
 Heinrich Klaasen (born 1991), South African cricketer
 Jelle Klaasen (born 1984), Dutch darts player
 Lorraine Klaasen (born 1957), South African/Canadian musician, daughter of Thandi Klaasen
  (born 1958), Dutch bassist known by his pseudonym Luc Ex
 Raven Klaasen (born 1982), South African tennis player
 Robert Klaasen (born 1993), Dutch footballer
 Davy Klaassen (born 1993), Dutch footballer
 Thandi Klaasen (1931–2017), South African musician, mother of Lorraine Klaasen

See also
 16958 Klaasen, a Mars-crossing asteroid
, the Dutch puppet version of Pulcinella (Mister Punch)
 Claassen
 Klaassen
 Klassen

Dutch-language surnames
Patronymic surnames
Surnames from given names